Jangaon Mandal (also known as tehsil, tahsil, taluka or taluq) is an administrative division or Sub District in  Jangaon district in the Indian state of Telangana.

Geography 

History 

In 1854 the Jangaon Taluka was under Bhonagheer Circars. Jangaon is mentioned as Zungaon in an 1854 map. In 1866 new districts were created; all Circars were delimited and merged. Bhonagheer, Davercondah and Nelgoondah Circars merged to form Nalgonda District but the Jangaon Taluka was transferred from Bhongir Circar to Warangal District in 1866, Cherial was renamed Taluka by adding some parts of Wardannapet region, with its headquarters at Jangaon.

1905 Jangaon Taluka was transferred to Nalgonda District from Warangal district.  Hyderabad State was annexed to the Dominion of India by operation polo in 1948, and became an Indian state. In 1948 Jangaon taluka was part of Nalgonda district in Gulshanabad Division of Hyderabad State.

In 1953, there was a shuffling of areas, shifting some villages from one taluka to the other. Subsequently, when Warangal district was divided to facilitate administrative control and on 1 October 1953, Khammam district was formed. But again Jangaon taluka from Nalgonda district have become part of Warangal district. After these changes in 1953, few villages of Jangaon taluka went to Medak district and some remained in Nalgonda district. During the reign of Marri Chenna Reddy in 1979, Jangaon taluka was split into Cherial, Kodakandla and Jangaon talukas, at that time Jangaon taluk consist of 7 Circles namely Jangaon, Cherial, Rebarthi, Narmetta, Ippaguda, Chennur and Kodakondla Cirles. In 1985, when N. T. Rama Rao introduced the mandal system, Jangaon taluka was further divided in to Jangaon, Raghunathpalle, Lingalaghanpur  Mandal and two villages merged in Station Ghanpur Mandal.

Demographics
Aler, Cheriyal, and Kolanpak were under Jangaon taluka before they were transferred to other districts.

, the census of India, the Jangaon Mandal had a population of 92,446. The total population consists of 46,807 males and 45,639  females—a sex ratio of 975 females per 1,000 males. 9207 children are in the age group of 0–6 years, of which 4711 are boys and 4496 are girls—a ratio of 954 per 1,000. The average literacy rate was 72.91% with male literacy rate is 73.57% and the female literacy rate is 57.53% in Jangaon Mandal.

As per Census 2011 out of total population, 56.7% people lives in Urban areas while 43.3% lives in the Rural areas. The average literacy rate in urban areas is 82.4% while that in the rural areas is 60.5%. Also the Sex Ratio of Urban areas in Jangaon Mandal is 952 while that of Rural areas is 975.

Towns and Villages 

Jangaon Mandal now consist of Jangaon Municipality and 19 Panchayats Villages.

 Goparajpalle
 Peddapahad
 Venkriyala
 Adavikeshvapur
 Yerragollapahad
 Marigadi
 Gangupahad
 Wadlakonda
 Oblakeshvapur
 Peddaramancherla
 Chowdarpalle
 Siddenki
 Pasarmadla
 Yellamla
 Pembarthy
 Shamirpet
 Cheetakodur
 Chowdaram
 Yeswanthapur

References 

Jangaon district
Mandals in Jangaon district